On 24 November 2019, a Dornier 228 twin turboprop aircraft operated by local carrier Busy Bee Congo crashed shortly after takeoff from Goma International Airport in a densely populated section of the city, killing 20 of the 21 on board and 6 on the ground. It is the deadliest accident involving the Dornier 228.

Background
The airline operating the plane, Busy Bee Congo, was founded in 2007 and uses Goma as the base for its fleet of Dornier 228s. Due to lack of funds, poverty, lack of oversight, and corruption in government, airline safety in the Democratic Republic of the Congo, especially among local low-price carriers, is infamously lax with all the local carriers banned from operating in the European Union.

Aircraft and crew 
The aircraft was a Dornier 228 twin turboprop built in 1984. It had been owned by three previous operators. The aircraft did not carry a cockpit voice recorder or a flight data recorder. While in service with Olympic Aviation (during which its registration was SX-BHC) on 9 January 1994, the aircraft was involved in an accident at when it struck power lines on approach to runway 15L at Ellinikon International Airport and its left engine failed, but landed safely with no fatalities and was repaired.

The unnamed 52-year-old captain had 14,124 flight hours, including 3,048 hours on the Dornier 228. The unnamed 29-year-old first officer had 2,273 flight hours, with 1,635 of them on the Dornier 228.

Accident
According to reports the aircraft took off from the airport but suffered engine failure and crashed less than a minute after take off from runway 17. Witnesses describe the plane spinning three times as it crashed with thick black smoke coming from the engines. The aircraft violently burst in flames after impact in one of the densely populated areas of the city, the fire preventing locals from helping victims caught in the blaze.

19 people on board were killed on impact. One source reports that 2 passengers managed to be pulled from the blaze. The BBC reports that 9 casualties on the ground all came from one family.

Investigation 
The accident is being investigated by the Permanent Office of Investigations of Aviation Accidents/Incidents (BPEA), part of the DRC's Ministry of Transport and Channels of Communication. A preliminary report on the accident was released on 10 January 2020. The report stated that the aircraft take-off roll was unusually long, with a lower climb-out. The flight crew then requested to land on runway 35 without specifying why, after which the aircraft entered a rapid descent and crashed.

References 

2019 disasters in the Democratic Republic of the Congo
2019 in the Democratic Republic of the Congo
Accidents and incidents by airline of Africa
Aviation accidents and incidents in 2019
Aviation accidents and incidents in the Democratic Republic of the Congo
Goma
November 2019 events in Africa
Accidents and incidents involving the Dornier 228